WRCB (channel 3), branded on-air as Local 3, is a television station in Chattanooga, Tennessee, United States, affiliated with NBC. The station has been owned by Sarkes Tarzian, Inc. since 1982. WRCB's studios are located on Whitehall Road on Chattanooga's north side; its transmitter is located in the town of Walden on Signal Mountain. Although parts of the Chattanooga market are in the Central Time Zone, all schedules are listed in Eastern Time.

History
The station signed on the air on May 6, 1956 on analog Channel 3 as WRGP-TV. The call letters came from its founder, Ramon G. Patterson. It picked up the NBC affiliation from WROM-TV in Rome, Georgia (now WTVC, located today in Chattanooga proper). Its studios were first located at 1214 McCallie Avenue, between downtown and Missionary Ridge.

The station has belonged to several owners over the years. In 1959, Friendly Broadcasting, owner of WSTV-TV in Steubenville, Ohio (now WTOV-TV) bought WRGP from Patterson's group. In 1961, WSTV and WRGP were sold to the Massachusetts-based United Printers and Publishers, which later became Rust Craft Broadcasting, named after its greeting card line, which has since been acquired by American Greetings. These owners changed the station's call letters to WRCB-TV in 1963, to reflect the initials of the licensee. In 1968 the station moved to new facilities on Whitehall Road, on Chattanooga's north side, across the Tennessee River from downtown. Those new studios and equipment enabled channel 3 to begin broadcasting in color. In 1979, Rust Craft merged with magazine publisher Ziff Davis, which, in turn, sold WRCB to current owner Sarkes Tarzian, Inc. of Bloomington, Indiana, in 1982.

Programming

Syndicated programming
Syndicated programming on WRCB includes Entertainment Tonight, Inside Edition (which is hosted by North Georgia native Deborah Norville), The Jennifer Hudson Show, and Rachael Ray.

News operation

WRCB produces 6½ hours of news each weekday, and six hours of news on weekends. The station is known for its "School Patrol" and "Crimestoppers" reports, which have been popular features on its newscasts for more than twenty years. On September 28, 2012, WRCB made the on-air transition from standard definition (4:3) to high definition (16:9). On January 15, 2022, the station debuted a new logo, graphics, and website. The new look included a re-branding of its on-air identity to Local 3.

Technical information

Subchannels
The station's digital signal is multiplexed:

On November 1, 2008, WRCB added Retro Television Network (RTV) on its second digital subchannel; the station had previously aired NBC Weather Plus on the subchannel, but that network was shut down by the end of the year. On January 1, 2012, WRCB replaced RTV with Antenna TV.

Analog-to-digital conversion
WRCB shut down its analog signal, over VHF channel 3, on June 12, 2009, the official date in which full-power television stations in the United States transitioned from analog to digital broadcasts under federal mandate. The station's digital signal remained on its pre-transition VHF channel 13. Through the use of PSIP, digital television receivers display the station's virtual channel as its former VHF analog channel 3.

As part of the SAFER Act, WRCB kept its analog signal on the air until July 12 to inform viewers of the digital television transition through a loop of public service announcements from the National Association of Broadcasters.

References

External links

RCB
NBC network affiliates
Ion Television affiliates
Dabl affiliates
Scripps News affiliates
Television channels and stations established in 1956
1956 establishments in Tennessee